Cap de Boumort is a mountain of Catalonia, Spain. It has an elevation of 2,075 metres above sea level.

It is the highest summit of the Serra de Boumort range in the Pre-Pyrenees.

See also
Mountains of Catalonia

References

Mountains of Catalonia
Emblematic summits of Catalonia